Robert Joseph Tubman (August 18, 1897 – November 29, 1975) was a Canadian football player and referee and Ottawa businessman. He was a member of two Grey Cup championship teams.

Playing career
Tubman was a star football player in  the Canadian Football League for thirteen seasons for the Ottawa Rough Riders, then known as the Ottawa Senators. Tubman led his team to two Grey Cup wins, in 1925 and 1926. After retiring from the field, Tubman worked as a referee for 15 years.

Awards
He was inducted into the Canadian Football Hall of Fame in 1968 and into the Canada's Sports Hall of Fame in 1975.

Personal life
He died in 1975, and was interred in Pinecrest Cemetery in Ottawa.

External links
 Canada's Sports Hall of Fame profile

1897 births
1975 deaths
Ottawa Rough Riders players
Canadian Football Hall of Fame inductees
Players of Canadian football from Ontario
Canadian football people from Ottawa
Canadian football officials